Julius A. Archibald (1901-1979) was an American lawyer and politician from New York City. Archibald was a Democratic State Senator for one term (169th New York State Legislature) from 1953 to 1954. He ran on a civil rights platform and was a member of the NAACP. He was born in Trinidad. Archibald defeated Harold I. Panken in the Democratic primary for the 21st district, which covered part of New York City. He won the general election and was the first African-American member of the New York Senate. He was replaced by James Lopez Watson.

References

1901 births
1979 deaths
African-American lawyers
Trinidad and Tobago emigrants to the United States
New York (state) lawyers
African-American state legislators in New York (state)
NAACP activists
People from Harlem
Democratic Party New York (state) state senators
20th-century American politicians
20th-century American lawyers
20th-century African-American politicians
African-American men in politics